Haselbach is a river of Bavaria, Germany. It is a right tributary of the Kammel near Neuburg an der Kammel.

See also
List of rivers of Bavaria

References

Rivers of Bavaria
Rivers of Germany